Killashandra may refer to:

 Killeshandra, a town in County Cavan, Ireland
 Killashandra railway station, a disused railway station in County Cavan
 Killashandra Ree, a character in the novel Crystal Singer by Anne McCaffrey
 Killashandra (novel), a 1986 novel by Anne McCaffrey